Everything Goes (stylized as everything goes) is a 2004 short film directed by Andrew Kotatko. It is based on the 1978 short story Why Don't You Dance? from Raymond Carver's 1981 collection What We Talk About When We Talk About Love. The film stars Hugo Weaving, Abbie Cornish and Sullivan Stapleton. Everything Goes won the award for Best Short Film at the 2004 Inside Film Awards and was the only Australian film selected for the prestigious Clermont-Ferrand International Short Film Festival in 2005.

Synopsis

The film depicts the unlikely relationship that forms between a young couple (Cornish and Stapleton) looking to begin their future together and a lonely middle-aged man (Weaving) trying to rid himself of the past.

Cast
Hugo Weaving as Ray
Abbie Cornish as Brianie
Sullivan Stapleton as Jack
Nikki Bennett as Ray's Wife

Reviews

The film received positive reviews from critics. In an article on Australian cinema for Cinematical.com, respected American film critic Jeffrey M. Anderson praised Everything Goes as "everything a great short film can be" and noted that "Kotatko makes spectacular use of light and space, using Carver's words when necessary and conjuring up wordless images just as potent".

References

External links
 
 Everything Goes at Cinematical.com

2004 films
Australian drama short films
2004 drama films
2000s English-language films
2000s Australian films